Dr. T & the Women is the soundtrack to Robert Altman's film, Dr. T & the Women.  All tracks are instrumentals except, "Ain't It Somethin'," "You've Been So Good Up Till Now" and "She's Already Made Up Her Mind." "Ain't It Something" is a rerecording of a song from Lovett's 1994 album I Love Everybody, while "You've Been So Good Up Till Now" and "She's Already Made Up Her Mind" were previously released on his 1992 album Joshua Judges Ruth.

Track listing

Personnel 

Sweet Pea Atkinson – backing vocals
Pat Bergeson – electric guitar
Sir Harry Bowens – backing vocals
Debra Byrd – backing vocals
Stuart Duncan – fiddle
Gene Elders – pre-production
Paul Franklin – steel guitar
James Gilmer – percussion
Al Gramling – assistant engineer
William "Bill" Greene – backing vocals
Robert Hadley – assistant mastering engineer
John Hagen – cello
Ray Herndon – rhythm guitar
Viktor Krauss – bass
Nathaniel Kunkel – engineer, mixing
Russ Kunkel – drums
Helena Lea – music supervisor
Lyle Lovett – acoustic guitar, composer, vocals, producer
Arnold McCuller – backing vocals
Dean Parks – rhythm guitar
John Richards – engineer
Matt Rollings – piano
Doug Sax – mastering
Johnny Lee Schell – electric guitar
Leland Sklar – bass
Kathi Whitley – project coordinator
Billy Williams – producer

References

Lyle Lovett albums
2000 soundtrack albums
MCA Records soundtracks
Romance film soundtracks
Comedy film soundtracks